is a Japanese professional baseball pitcher for the Yokohama DeNA BayStars of the Nippon Professional Baseball (NPB). He has played in NPB for the Tohoku Rakuten Golden Eagles.

Career

Tohoku Rakuten Golden Eagles
Morihara began his career with the Tohoku Rakuten Golden Eagles, making his NPB debut on March 31, 2017. In his rookie campaign, he pitched to a 2-4 record and 4.81 ERA across 42 appearances. His numbers took a dip in 2018, regressing to a 5.82 ERA with 19 strikeouts across 17.0 innings pitched.  Morihara made 64 appearances for the Eagles in 2019, posting the best season of his career. In 64.0 innings of work, he struck out 65 batters, while working to a 4-2 record and 1.97 ERA.

In the COVID-19-affected 2020 season, Morihara took a big step back, struggling to a 7.56 ERA with 14 strikeouts across 17 contests. He returned the next year to make 34 appearances, posting a tidy 2.78 ERA with 30 strikeouts in 32.1 innings pitched. In 2022, Morihara pitched in 3 games for the Eagles, allowing no runs in any of the games.

Yokohama DeNA BayStars
On July 26, 2022, Morihara was traded to the Yokohama DeNA BayStars in exchange for Yukiya Itoh. He made 6 appearances for Yokohama to close out the season, allowing 4 earned runs while striking out 8 in 6.0 innings pitched.

International career 
Morihara represented the Japan national baseball team in the 2019 exhibition games against Mexico.

On February 27, 2019, he was selected at the 2019 exhibition games against Mexico.

On October 1, 2019, he was selected at the 2019 WBSC Premier12. But, on October 21, he canceled due to right elbow discomfort.

References

External links

 NPB.com

1991 births
Living people
Japanese baseball players
Nippon Professional Baseball pitchers
Baseball people from Hiroshima Prefecture
Tohoku Rakuten Golden Eagles players
Yokohama DeNA BayStars players